River Line SSSI is a  geological Site of Special Scientific Interest south of Robertsbridge in East Sussex. It is a Geological Conservation Review site.

This site exposes a sequence of sections in the Purbeck Beds, which date to the Upper Jurassic and Lower Cretaceous periods. The sections throw light on the environment of the period and some are marine, with fossil ostracods and crustaceans.

References

Sites of Special Scientific Interest in East Sussex
Geological Conservation Review sites